Lucescu is a Romanian surname. Notable people with the surname include:

 Mircea Lucescu (born 1945), Romanian footballer and coach
 Răzvan Lucescu (born 1969), Romanian footballer and coach, son of Mircea

Romanian-language surnames